Zebrafish is a quarterly peer-reviewed journal focusing on research using the zebrafish and related species. It is published by Mary Ann Liebert.

It was founded in 2004 by Paul Collodi, professor of animal science at Purdue University.

Biology journals
Quarterly journals
Publications established in 2004
Mary Ann Liebert academic journals